Twilight: Original Motion Picture Soundtrack is the official soundtrack to Twilight, released on November 4, 2008.

The soundtrack was chosen by music supervisor Alexandra Patsavas; while the score, Twilight: The Score, was composed by Carter Burwell. The soundtrack album was released by Patsavas' Chop Shop label in conjunction with Atlantic Records. It debuted at #1 on the Billboard 200, having sold about 165,000 copies in its first week of release, 29% of which were digital downloads. Twilight: The Score was made available for digital download on November 25, 2008, and the album was released to stores on December 9, 2008.

Twilight is the best-selling theatrical movie soundtrack in the United States since Chicago. Both the soundtrack and the lead single, "Decode" by Paramore, were nominated for the 2010 Grammy Awards.

Twilight: Original Motion Picture Soundtrack
Director Catherine Hardwicke revealed in an interview with MTV that a song by alternative rock band Muse, later revealed to be "Supermassive Black Hole", would be included on the film's soundtrack. The soundtrack includes two songs by Paramore, a new song by Mutemath, and an original song for the film by Perry Farrell. "Flightless Bird, American Mouth" by Iron & Wine was chosen for inclusion in the movie by actress Kristen Stewart, who plays Bella Swan. The soundtrack won a 2009 American Music Award for Favorite Soundtrack.

Marketing
The CD booklet on the physical CD folds out into one of four Twilight posters. Hot Topic locations across the United States hosted exclusive Twilight soundtrack listening parties on October 24. Albums bought at Borders bookstores feature an acoustic version of Paramore's "Decode". Summit Entertainment provided a free remix of "Bella's Lullaby" through iTunes, with the purchase of a Twilight theatre ticket through online ticket services Fandango or MovieTickets.com.

Track listing

Notes
The first song of the ending credits, Radiohead's "15 Step" (3:59), was not included on the soundtrack.

Singles
 "Decode", by Paramore, was the first single released from the soundtrack. It premiered on Paramore's fan club site and Stephenie Meyer's official website on October 1, 2008. The music video for "Decode" premiered on November 3. The song was certified Platinum in the U.S on February 16, 2010, selling over 1,000,000 copies. It was also nominated for a Grammy Award in 2010 for Best Song Written for a Movie.
 "Go All the Way (Into the Twilight)" by Perry Farrell was the second single released from the soundtrack. It premiered on Meyer's website on October 23, 2008.
 "Twilight", by Clei Ribeiro, was the last single released from the soundtrack. A rumor about a Twilight Saga series with this song brought all the buzz.

Chart performance
The Twilight soundtrack debuted at #1 on the Billboard 200, selling 165,000 copies in its first week, according to Nielsen Soundscan. Twilight is the first soundtrack to hit #1 in advance of its film's release since the 8 Mile soundtrack in 2002. The album was certified double platinum on April 16, 2009. After a re-release of the album in a "Deluxe Edition" in March, 2009, it climbed from #14 to #3 on the Billboard 200, selling 74,000 copies. It remained on the Billboard 200 for 48 consecutive weeks.  As of April 2014, the album has sold 2,807,000 copies in the US.

The soundtrack peaked at number one in New Zealand on February 9, 2009 and has been certified platinum, selling over 15,000 copies. The album has been certified gold in Mexico, selling over 50,000 copies.

Weekly charts

Year-end charts

Certifications

Twilight: The Score

Carter Burwell composed and orchestrated the score for Twilight over a 9- to 10-week period, and it was recorded and mixed in about 2 weeks in late September 2008. He began the score with a "Love Theme" for Bella and Edward's relationship, a variation of which became "Bella's Lullaby" that Robert Pattinson plays in the film and that is included on the Twilight Original Motion Picture Soundtrack. The original theme is featured throughout the film, and serves to "play the romance that drives the story". Another theme Burwell composed was a "Predator Theme", which opens the film, and is intended to play Edward's vampire nature. Other themes include a bass-line, drum beat and distorted guitar sound for the nomadic vampires, and a melody for the Cullen family. Twilight: The Score was released digitally on November 25, 2008 and in stores on December 9. The score album had sold 218,000 copies in the United States as of June 2010.

Track listing

Chart performance

References

External links
 Official Twilight soundtrack website
 
 

Film scores
2000s film soundtrack albums
The Twilight Saga (film series) soundtracks
2008 soundtrack albums
Atlantic Records soundtracks
Chop Shop Records soundtracks
Romance film soundtracks
Fantasy film soundtracks